Decatur City is a city in Decatur County, Iowa, United States. The population was 175 at the time of the 2020 census.

History
Decatur City was the first county seat of Decatur County, until 1853, when the seat was transferred to Leon.

Decatur City was incorporated in 1875.

Geography
Decatur City is located on Iowa Highway 2 just east of I-35, 4.5 miles west of Leon and approximately eight miles north-northeast of Lamoni.

Demographics

2010 census
As of the census of 2010, there were 197 people, 78 households, and 53 families living in the city. The racial makeup of the city was 95.9% White, 0.5% Native American, 1.0% Asian, and 2.5% from two or more races. Hispanic or Latino of any race were 1.0% of the population.

There were 78 households, of which 28.2% had children under the age of 18 living with them, 52.6% were married couples living together, 10.3% had a female householder with no husband present, 5.1% had a male householder with no wife present, and 32.1% were non-families. 24.4% of all households were made up of individuals, and 12.8% had someone living alone who was 65 years of age or older. The average household size was 2.53 and the average family size was 3.08.

The median age in the city was 39.5 years. 23.9% of residents were under the age of 18; 8.1% were between the ages of 18 and 24; 28.4% were from 25 to 44; 24.4% were from 45 to 64; and 15.2% were 65 years of age or older. The gender makeup of the city was 50.3% male and 49.7% female.

2000 census
As of the census of 2000, there were 199 people, 92 households, and 50 families living in the city. The racial makeup of the city was 98.49% White, 1.51% from other races. Hispanic or Latino of any race were 1.01% of the population.

There were 92 households, out of which 26.1% had children under the age of 18 living with them, 48.9% were married couples living together, 6.5% had a female householder with no husband present, and 44.6% were non-families. 41.3% of all households were made up of individuals, and 19.6% had someone living alone who was 65 years of age or older. The average household size was 2.16 and the average family size was 2.98.

In the city, the population was spread out, with 26.1% under the age of 18, 6.5% from 18 to 24, 29.6% from 25 to 44, 26.1% from 45 to 64, and 11.6% who were 65 years of age or older. The median age was 37 years. For every 100 females, there were 89.5 males. For every 100 females age 18 and over, there were 93.4 males.

The median income for a household in the city was $21,250, and the median income for a family was $27,917. Males had a median income of $22,000 versus $16,250 for females. The per capita income for the city was $14,394. About 15.4% of families and 26.3% of the population were below the poverty line, including 33.3% of those under the age of eighteen and 16.1% of those 65 or over.

Education
The Central Decatur Community School District operates local area public schools.

References

Cities in Iowa
Cities in Decatur County, Iowa